Tapiola (Finnish) or Hagalund (Swedish) is an underground station on the western extension (Länsimetro) of the Helsinki Metro. The station is located 1,3 kilometres east from Urheilupuisto metro station and 1,7 kilometres southwest from Aalto University metro station.

References

External links
 http://www.lansimetro.fi/en/stations/tapiola.html
Länsimetro work in progress

Helsinki Metro stations
2017 establishments in Finland
Tapiola